Salisbury is a town in Addison County, Vermont, United States. The population was 1,221 at the 2020 census.

History
Salisbury was chartered on November 3, 1761 as one of the New Hampshire Grants issued by Benning Wentworth. The town may have been named after Salisbury, Connecticut (which was named after Salisbury, Wiltshire), or for James Cecil, 6th Earl of Salisbury.

Geography
Salisbury is located in southern Addison County along the western edge of the Green Mountains and the eastern edge of the Champlain Valley. U.S. Route 7 passes through the town leading north to Middlebury and south to Brandon and Rutland. The northern half of Lake Dunmore is in the eastern part of the town, and is the site of Branbury State Park.

Demographics

As of the census of 2000, there were 1,090 people, 423 households, and 302 families residing in the town.  The population density was 37.4 people per square mile (14.4/km2).  There were 628 housing units at an average density of 21.5 per square mile (8.3/km2).  The racial makeup of the town was 98.17% White, 0.09% Native American, 0.28% Asian, 0.18% from other races, and 1.28% from two or more races. Hispanic or Latino of any race were 0.28% of the population.

There were 423 households, out of which 34.3% had children under the age of 18 living with them, 58.9% were married couples living together, 8.3% had a female householder with no husband present, and 28.4% were non-families. 22.9% of all households were made up of individuals, and 8.0% had someone living alone who was 65 years of age or older.  The average household size was 2.54 and the average family size was 2.96.

In the town, the age distribution of the population shows 25.6% under the age of 18, 6.1% from 18 to 24, 28.8% from 25 to 44, 27.2% from 45 to 64, and 12.4% who were 65 years of age or older.  The median age was 39 years. For every 100 females, there were 100.4 males.  For every 100 females age 18 and over, there were 97.8 males.

The median income for a household in the town was $39,500, and the median income for a family was $45,455. Males had a median income of $27,107 versus $21,827 for females. The per capita income for the town was $19,306.  About 5.1% of families and 7.7% of the population were below the poverty line, including 8.6% of those under age 18 and 2.5% of those age 65 or over.

Parks and recreation
Branbury State Park, a  park on the shore of Lake Dunmore, is located in Salisbury. The park has  of natural sandy beach, hiking trails, waterfalls, caves and camping areas. The park originally operated as a farm and then a summer boys' camp before being named a state park in 1945.

Notable people

 Henry Olin, congressman from Vermont and sixth Lieutenant Governor of Vermont
 John Prout, Justice of the Vermont Supreme Court
 Wilbur F. Storey, 19th Century editor and publisher, owned Detroit Free Press and Chicago Times

Climate
This climatic region is typified by large seasonal temperature differences, with warm to hot (and often humid) summers and cold (sometimes severely cold) winters.  According to the Köppen Climate Classification system, Salisbury has a humid continental climate, abbreviated "Dfb" on climate maps.

Notes

References

External links
 
 Town of Salisbury official website
 City-Data.com
 Virtual Vermont: Salisbury Vermont
 ePodunk: Profile for Salisbury Vermont
 Vermont State Parks: Branbury State Park

 
Towns in Vermont
Towns in Addison County, Vermont